Moose Lake Provincial Park  is a provincial park in northern Alberta, Canada, located  west of Bonnyville.

It was established on April 19, 1967 and is maintained by Alberta Tourism, Parks and Recreation.

Activities
The following activities are available in the park:
Beach activities on the shores of Moose Lake and Mooselake River
Power boating
Sailing
Swimming
Water-skiing
Windsurfing
Camping
Canoeing and kayaking
Fishing (brook stickleback, burbot, Iowa darter, lake whitefish, ninespine stickleback, northern pike, spottail shiner, tullibee, walleye, white sucker, yellow perch)
Front country hiking

See also
List of provincial parks in Alberta
List of Canadian provincial parks
List of National Parks of Canada

References

External links

Municipal District of Bonnyville No. 87
Provincial parks of Alberta